Forrokhshahr District is in Shahrekord County, Chaharmahal and Bakhtiari province, Iran. At the latest National Census in 2016, the district had 37,068 inhabitants living in 10,934 households. The center of the district is the city of Farrokh Shahr, whose population was 28,920 in 2006, 30,036 in 2011, and 31,739 at the 2016 census.

References 

Shahrekord County

Districts of Chaharmahal and Bakhtiari Province

Populated places in Chaharmahal and Bakhtiari Province

Populated places in Shahr-e Kord County

fa:بخش فرخ‌شهر